The Six Wives of Henry VIII is a 2001 television documentary series about the wives of King Henry VIII presented by historian David Starkey from historic locations with added re-enactments.

Principal cast
Chris Larkin as Henry VIII of England, episodes one and two
Andy Rashleigh as Henry VIII of England, episodes three and four
Annabelle Dowler as Catherine of Aragon
Julia Marsen as Anne Boleyn
Charlotte Roach as Jane Seymour
Catherine Siggins as Anne of Cleves
Michelle Abrahams as Catherine Howard
Caroline Lintott as Catherine Parr
Michael Fitzgerald as Thomas Wolsey
David Fleeshman as Thomas Cromwell
Wilf Scolding as Thomas Culpeper
Richard Felix as Thomas Seymour, 1st Baron Seymour of Sudeley
Christopher Reeks as Thomas Cranmer
Richard Syms as Stephen Gardiner

Episodes

Accolades
The series was nominated in the 2002 BAFTA Television Awards for the Huw Wheldon Award for Specialist Factual.

References

External links

2000s British documentary television series
Channel 4 original programming
Television series about the history of England
Cultural depictions of the wives of Henry VIII
2001 British television series debuts
2001 British television series endings
English-language television shows